Daspoort is an area in Pretoria, South Africa. It lies north-west of the Pretoria CBD.

History
The suburb was created in 1897 on the farm Daspoort. The area was discovered in 1836 by Andries Pretorius and named after the rock hyrax. The nearby Daspoort Tunnel is named after the suburb.

References

Suburbs of Pretoria